Perez v. Mortgage Bankers Association, 575 U.S. 92 (2015), was a United States Supreme Court case in which the Court held that the D.C. Circuit's Paralyzed Veterans doctrine is contrary to a clear reading of the Administrative Procedure Act and "improperly imposes on agencies an obligation beyond the Act's maximum procedural requirements."

Opinion of the Court 
Associate Justice Sonia Sotomayor authored the opinion of the Court.

Associate Justices Samuel Alito, Antonin Scalia, and Clarence Thomas authored concurring opinions.

See also 

 List of United States Supreme Court cases
List of United States Supreme Court cases, volume 575

References

External links
 
 SCOTUSblog coverage

United States Supreme Court cases
United States Supreme Court cases of the Roberts Court
2015 in United States case law